Chianche is a town and comune in province of Avellino, in the Campania region of Italy.

The town rises on the border between the provinces of Avellino and Benevento, on top of a green hill. It is surrounded by chestnut-tree woods, while the fertile countryside produces olive oil and the   DOC wine "Greco di Tufo".

The town's history dates back from c. 300, when it was named Planca. It was ruled by many different feudal families, included the Caracciolo and Carafa.

References